Big Dark Love is the seventh studio album by the American indie rock band Murder by Death. The album is a follow-up to their sixth studio album Bitter Drink, Bitter Moon, released in 2012. Produced by Kevin Ratterman under the label Bloodshot Records, the album was released on 3 February 2015.

Critical reception

Writing for Exclaim!, Blake Morneau hailed the record as "a walloping triumph of great roots songwriting," further noting it has "big, dark secrets hidden away in its seams that call out for repeated listens until you can draw them into the light." Leah Dearborn of Elmore Magazine commented that the band "has been experimenting with their established sound, implementing a range of percussion, horn and even a touch of electronica" but that fans "can look forward to the same distinctive, mournful tones that Murder By Death has cultivated over the past 15 years."

Track listing

References

2015 albums
Murder by Death (band) albums
Bloodshot Records albums